The Bobby Bourn Memorial Players Championship was a darts tournament staged by the Professional Darts Corporation (PDC). It originally took place as a warm up to the Stan James World Matchplay in Blackpool every July. However, in 2009, the tournament moved to a new date in January and a new venue at the Doncaster Dome. In 2010, the tournament was moved to spring and held at the Barnsley Metrodome.

The tournament is named after Bobby Bourn, who had an extensive involvement in the Whitley Bay darts league for over 30 years until his death in 2002. Bourn also performed the role of "player marshal" at PDC televised events, providing assistance to the professional players when they competed and ensuring they were in the right place at the right time before going out for matches. 

Phil Taylor won the tournament in its first six years, however he missed the next three events, which were won by Terry Jenkins, Simon Whitlock, and Andy Smith.

Previous finals

References

External links
Bobby Bourn article North East Chronicle
Tournament results

2003 establishments in England
2011 disestablishments in England
Darts tournaments
Professional Darts Corporation tournaments